Marcho Dafchev (born 12 May 1978 in Plovdiv) is a former Bulgarian footballer who played as an attacking midfielder. He is currently working as a youth team coach at Lokomotiv Plovdiv.

He has been capped by Bulgaria once in 2005. Dafchev previously played for Sokol Komatevo, CSKA Sofia, Patraikos in Greece, Botev Plovdiv and Neftchi Baku in Azerbaijan.

Career
Born in Plovdiv to Peter Dafchev, Dafchev was in the youth setups of Maritsa before moving to Sokol Komatevo.

In June 1998, at the age of 20, he joined Lokomotiv Sofia. Dafchev made his debut during the 1998–99 season on 8 August 1998 in a 1–3 away loss against Litex Lovech, coming on as a substitute for Ivaylo Pargov. He scored his first goal for Lokomotiv in a 1–0 home win against Levski Kyustendil on 17 October 1998. Dafchev made 27 league appearances and a total of 34 matches scoring eight goals during his debut season with the Railwaymen.

He left Lokomotiv for CSKA Sofia during the January 2002 transfer window, but earned only 6 appearances in the A PFG and was released just five months later, signing a contract with Greek side A.O. Patraikos.

In July 2003, Dafchev joined Botev Plovdiv. He made his debut on the opening day of the 2003–04 season in a 1–0 win over Rodopa Smolyan on 9 August. Twenty days later Dafchev scored his first Botev and Plovdiv derby goal, opening the scoring in a 2–3 defeat against Lokomotiv Plovdiv. On 28 September he scored twice in a 3–1 home victory over CSKA Sofia. Dafchev made 24 appearances for the Canaries, scoring nine goals, but Botev were relegated from the A PFG at the end of the campaign. 
In the summer of 2004, Dafchev signed for his previously team Lokomotiv Sofia. On 10 August 2006, he scored his first ever European goal, netting a free-kick against Bnei Yehuda Tel Aviv in a 2–0 away win. On 14 September, Dafchev scored free-kick and in a 2–2 home draw against Feyenoord. The following 2007–08 season he netted his third European goal in a 3–1 home win over Oţelul Galaţi of the UEFA Cup on 16 August 2007. In a 3–1 league win over Pirin Blagoevgrad on 11 November 2007, Dafchev scored his 49th and 50th goals in all competitions for Lokomotiv.

In May 2008, Dafchev was sold to Neftchi Baku. He passed his medical on 29 May and signed a three-year contract. He earned 12 appearances in the Azerbaijan Premier League and scored two goals.

On 15 August 2009, Dafchev returned to Lokomotiv Sofia after being released from his contract at Neftchi Baku. During the 2009–10 season he scored once in a 2–4 away loss against Cherno More on 7 November 2009. At the end of the following 2010–11 season, Dafchev became the club's second topscorer with 7 goals in 19 appearances and provided 6 assists for his team-mates.

Coaching career

Marcho Dafchev started his coaching career during the 2013–14 season when he was appointed as head coach of Eurocollege in the 3rd division. In the next season Dafchev joined the youth academy of his former club Botev Plovdiv as a coach of the children born in 2002. On 1 June 2015 his team won the championship after 0–1 away win over Lokomotiv Plovdiv.

Career statistics
As of 12 June 2011

References

External links

Bulgarian footballers
1978 births
Living people
First Professional Football League (Bulgaria) players
FC Lokomotiv 1929 Sofia players
Botev Plovdiv players
PFC CSKA Sofia players
Patraikos F.C. players
Bulgaria international footballers
Footballers from Plovdiv
Association football midfielders
Neftçi PFK players
Bulgarian expatriate footballers
Expatriate footballers in Greece
Bulgarian expatriate sportspeople in Greece
Expatriate footballers in Azerbaijan
Bulgarian expatriate sportspeople in Azerbaijan